The Marquise of Clermont (German: Die Marquise von Clermont) is a 1922 Austrian silent film directed by Hans Homma and starring Grit Haid, Egon Friedell and Adolf Weisse.

Cast
 Grit Haid as Germaine 
 Egon Friedell as König 
 Adolf Weisse as Herzog von Clermont 
 Kurt von Lessen as Schreiber Collin 
 Hanns Marschall as Yves 
 Rida Waldeck
 Franz Bronen
 Louis Nerz

References

Bibliography
 Paolo Caneppele & Günter Krenn. Elektrische Schatten. Filmarchiv Austria, 1999.

External links

1922 films
Austrian silent feature films
Films directed by Hans Homma
Films based on works by Honoré de Balzac
Austrian black-and-white films